The 2013 Indian Open was a professional ranking snooker tournament held between 14 and 18 October 2013 at the Le Meridien Hotel in New Delhi, India. It was the first ranking event held in India, and the fourth ranking event of the 2013/2014 season.

Ding Junhui won his eighth ranking title by defeating Aditya Mehta 5–0 in the final. Ding became the first player to win two consecutive ranking titles in the same season since Ronnie O'Sullivan in 2002/2003, who won the 2003 European Open and the 2003 Irish Masters. At the tournament Mehta became the first Indian player to reach the final of a ranking event.

Prize fund
The breakdown of prize money for this year is shown below:

 Winner: £50,000
 Runner-up: £25,000
 Semi-final: £13,500
 Quarter-final: £9,000
 Last 16: £6,000
 Last 32: £3,000
 Last 64: £2,000

 Televised highest break: £2,000
 Total: £300,000

Wildcard round
These matches were played in New Delhi on 14 October 2013. The Indian wildcard players were selected through a qualifying tournament.

Main draw

Final

Qualifying
These matches were held on 11 and 12 August 2013 at the Doncaster Dome in Doncaster, England. All matches were best of 7 frames.

Century breaks

Qualifying stage centuries

 136  Andrew Higginson
 134  Marco Fu
 129  Martin O'Donnell
 126  Elliot Slessor
 125  Chen Zhe
 121  Fergal O'Brien
 114  Mark Davis
 111  Jamie O'Neill
 109, 101  Zhang Anda
 105  Peter Ebdon
 105  Xiao Guodong
 105  Liam Highfield
 104  Aditya Mehta
 103  Graeme Dott
 103  Paul Davison
 102  Fraser Patrick
 101  David Gilbert
 101  Kyren Wilson
 100  Joe Perry
 100  Kurt Maflin

Televised stage centuries

 142, 109, 107, 106, 100  Ding Junhui
 138, 123, 103  Anthony McGill
 137  Marco Fu
 135, 125, 120  Gary Wilson
 134  Pankaj Advani
 133, 125  Michael White
 133  Zhang Anda
 132, 127, 122  Aditya Mehta
 131, 101  Ratchayothin Yotharuck
 119, 119, 117  Stuart Bingham
 114  Mark Joyce
 108  Rod Lawler
 104, 103, 103, 103, 100  Neil Robertson
 103, 100  Robbie Williams
 102  Ken Doherty
 102  Ricky Walden
 101  Liu Chuang
 100  Liang Wenbo
 100  Mark Williams

References

External links
 2013 Indian Open – Pictures mainly by Tai Chengzhe at Facebook

2013
Indian Open
Open
Sport in New Delhi
Indian Open